Bourbonia bifasciata is a species of beetle in the family Cerambycidae, and the only species in the genus Bourbonia. It was described by Karl Jordan in 1894.

References

Acanthocinini
Beetles described in 1894